Nossa Senhora das Neves is a parish of the municipality of Beja, in southeast Portugal. The population in 2011 was 1,747, in an area of 53.14 km2.

References

Freguesias of Beja, Portugal

pt:Nossa Senhora das Neves